The 2022-23 Summit League Conference men's basketball season started non-conference play on November 7, 2022, and began conference play on December 19, 2022. The regular season will end on February 25, 2023, and will set up the 2023 Summit League men's basketball tournament from March 3 to March 7, 2023.
Oral Roberts finished league play with a perfect 18-0 record, the second time that has happened in the Summit League's history and second year in a row a team has finished with a perfect league record (South Dakota State).
In the postseason, Oral Roberts made the 2023 NCAA Division I men's basketball tournament as a 12 seed. They lost to Duke in the first round.

Conference Changes
Following last year's postseason tournament, the Summit League announced they would be expanding the tournament in future years to include all 10 teams. It will consist of an added day to the tournament with the 7 through 10 seeds competing for the typical 7 and 8 seed slots.

Head Coaches

Coaching Changes

South Dakota
On March 16, 2022, Eric Peterson was announced as the new head coach of the Coyotes, after former coach Todd Lee was let go.

Omaha
On March 18, 2022, Chris Crutchfield was named head coach of the Mavericks, after longtime coach Derrin Hansen was fired.

Kansas City
On April 21, 2022, three-year Roos coach Billy Donlon left the program to be an associate head coach at Clemson. Then on April 26, 2022, Marvin Menzies was announced to be the new head coach for Kansas City.

Coaches

Notes:

 Year at school includes 2022-23 season.
 Overall and Summit League records are from the time at their current school and are through the end of the 2021-22.
 NCAA Tournament appearances are from the time at current school only.

^218 wins and 50 losses at the Division III level

^^8 NCAA Division III Tournaments

^^^4 NCAA Division III Sweet 16s, 2 NCAA Division III Final Fours, and 1 NCAA Division III National Championship

Preseason Awards
The Preseason Summit League men's basketball polls were released on October 11, 2022.

Preseason men's basketball polls
First Place Votes in Parenthesis

 Oral Roberts (28) - 731
 South Dakota State (11) - 668
 South Dakota (1) - 602
 North Dakota State - 549
 Denver - 432
 Kansas City - 310
 Western Illinois - 294
 St. Thomas - 289
 Omaha - 279
 North Dakota - 174

Preseason Honors

Regular season

Conference standings
Current as of February 25, 2023

Conference Matrix

Through February 25, 2023

Players of the Week

Records against other conferences
As of January 10, 2023:

Record against ranked non-conference opponents
Summit League record against ranked teams (rankings from AP Poll):

Summit League teams in Bold

Team rankings are reflective of AP poll when the game was played, not current or final ranking

† denotes games was played on neutral site

Points scored

Through February 18, 2023

Home attendance

Bold - Exceed capacity
As of February 25, 2023
Does not include exhibition games

All-League Honors

Source:

Postseason

Conference Tournament
All 10 teams qualify for the Summit League tournament. The tournament is held at the Denny Sanford Premier Center in Sioux Falls, South Dakota. It will be held this season from March 3 to March 7, 2023.

NCAA tournament

References

Summit League men's basketball tournament